is a railway station located in Kitakyūshū, Fukuoka.

Lines 

Chikuhō Electric Railroad
Chikuhō Electric Railroad Line

Platforms

Adjacent stations

Surrounding area
 Einomaru Elementary School
 Einomaru Junior High School
 Yahata Minami Senior High School
' Yahata Minami Kindergarten
 Yahata Einomaru Post Office
 Sakakihime Shrine
 Yahatakosei Hospital

Railway stations in Fukuoka Prefecture
Railway stations in Japan opened in 1956